Alexander Purves was a Scottish rugby union player.

He also played for London Scottish FC.

He was the brother of William Purves who was also capped for Scotland.

References
Bath, Richard (ed.) The Scotland Rugby Miscellany (Vision Sports Publishing Ltd, 2007 )

Scottish rugby union players
Scotland international rugby union players
Year of death missing
Year of birth missing